Geoff Hill (14 August 1936 – 2 September 1982) was  a former Australian rules footballer who played with Fitzroy in the Victorian Football League (VFL).	

Hill made his senior debut for New Norfolk in the Tasmanian Football League on his 18th birthday and played for them until joining Fitzroy in 1959. Later in his career he returned to New Norfolk and was a member of the 1968 premiership team under coach Trevor Leo.

He was inducted into the Tasmanian Football Hall of Fame in 2013.

Notes

External links 
		

1936 births
1982 deaths
Australian rules footballers from Tasmania
Fitzroy Football Club players
New Norfolk Football Club players
Tasmanian Football Hall of Fame inductees